Race Street is an abandoned and never used subway station of the Cincinnati Subway.  The station was planned to be the hub of the 16 mile system.  The station was planned in 1916, but lacked funding to complete.

The Race Street Station is the largest station in the system, and would have been one of the main downtown hubs. It's the only station that has a central platform, and three tracks (the center track is a stub on either side). West of the station, the subway curves north for the potential line towards Norwood. This curve is regarded to be one of the sharpest curves in subway history. On both sides of the station, there are provisions for expansions, which includes a stub track under Plum Street connecting to the "southbound"  track at the curve west of the station, as well as provisions east of the station for an extension towards Downtown and Oakley. The northernmost track would have been extended east under Central Parkway towards Oakley while the two other tracks curve south for an extension towards Fountain Square and Riverfront.

References

Rapid transit stations in Ohio
Former railway stations in Ohio